Mary Walker Phillips (November 23, 1923 – November 3, 2007) was an American textile artist, author and teacher. She revolutionized the craft of hand knitting by exploring knitting as an independent art form.  In the catalog to her 1984 Fresno Arts Center exhibition, Jack Lenor Larsen described Phillips as the "transition between the old-fashioned, pattern-book knitting and the extraordinary things going on in England and America today."  Her hand-knit tapestries and other creative pieces are exhibited in museums in the U.S. and Europe.

Biography 
Phillips was born in Fresno, California, on November 23, 1923, and began knitting in childhood as a traditional knitter.  She attended the Cranbrook Academy of Art in Bloomfield Hills, Michigan from 1946-1947, when she received her BFA, studying contemporary weaving and textiles. She moved to San Francisco and worked in the studio of Dorothy Liebes as a weaver before setting up her own studio. Her talent was quickly recognized by the wife of architect Frank Lloyd Wright, who commissioned her to create interior textiles for Taliesin West, the Wrights' home in Scottsdale, Arizona. Later, she traveled to Europe before returning to Fresno where she worked as a freelancer and teacher.

In 1960, she returned to the Cranbrook Academy of Art to continue her studies in experimental textiles. She earned her MFA in 1963. She then moved to Greenwich Village, New York City.

Work 
Inspired by a friend, textile designer Jack Lenor Larson, she added knitting to her artistic practice. The Fresno Art Museum showed 100 of her works in 1964. The works included woven upholstery, tie-dyed blankets, wall hangings, rugs, knitted sculptures and ceramics. She is well known for her architecturally inspired knitted wall hangings that were very abstract and is regarded as a pioneer in the use of experimental materials. These knitted art pieces incorporated unusual natural and synthetic materials such as linen, silk, paper, tape, leather, hair, asbestos fibers, seeds, fiberglass and metals. Unlike past knitting forms, she strayed away from the usual patterns and instead created works that resembled tapestries and lace. As a fellow of the American Craft Council, she is noted as being the first to acknowledge knitting as a form of artistic expression.

Phillips created woven textile works for architectural spaces, but soon her work transitioned from weaving into knitted works and macramé. This shift in her artistic practice was an important part of the transition of the 20th century fiber arts movement, that implicated the movement from utility to art.

Besides being an important fiber artist, she was also an important teacher and taught at the New School for Social Research.

Phillips is regarded as one of the most important fiber artists of the 20th century, as well as an important personality in the fiber arts movement and the advancement of the American studio craft.

Books 
Her books about hand knitting for the mass market and her workshops helped revolutionize the mass production industry, shifting it from woven fabrics to knits. Previously, knitting had been limited to the creation of practical items, such as sweaters. Her works and influence helped create the hand crafted, 'DIY' revolution.

Jack Lenor Larsen (a textile designer) wrote in the forward to Phillips' book, Step by Step Knitting, “[S]he is the great knitter of our time. She has taken knitting out of the socks-and-sweater doldrums to prove that knit fabric can be a blanket, a pillow, a piece of art ... she demonstrates that knitting is a creative medium of self-expression.”

Her works are in the permanent collections of the Smithsonian Institution in Washington D.C., the Art Institute of Chicago, the Museum of Modern Art in New York, the Royal Scottish Museum in Edinburgh, Scotland, and the Cooper-Hewitt National Museum of Design (Smithsonian) New York. She has written five books on knitting and macramé including: Step-by-Step Knitting (1967); Step-By-Step Macramé (1970) (which sold 700,000 copies by 1972); Creative Knitting, An Art Form (1971); Knitting (1977); and Knitting Counterpanes, Traditional Coverlet Patterns for Contemporary Knitters (1989).

In 1984, she was awarded a fellowship grant from the National Endowment for the Arts for her last book, Knitting Counterpanes: Traditional Coverlet Patterns for Contemporary Knitters.

Bibliography 

 Step by Step Knitting - 1967
 Step by Step Macramé - 1970
 Creative Knitting, A New Art Form - 1971, 1986
The Encyclopedia of Crafts - 1980
 Knitting Counterpanes, Traditional Coverlet Patterns for Contemporary Knitters - 1989

Death 
Phillips died from complications of Alzheimer's disease on November 3, 2007, at 83.

Works about Phillips 
Her nephew John Phillips wrote a book about her family, The Good Intent: The Story and Heritage of a Fresno Family (New York: Magnolia Group Press, 2007).

References

External links
Fresno Art Museum entry
NY Times obit
Biography on the Cooper Hewitt Website 

1923 births
2007 deaths
Cranbrook Academy of Art alumni
Neurological disease deaths in the United States
Deaths from Alzheimer's disease
Knitting
Writers from Fresno, California
People from Greenwich Village
American textile artists
People in knitting
Women textile artists
20th-century American non-fiction writers